Oddball is the name of two fictional supervillains appearing in American comic books published by Marvel Comics.

Publication history
Oddball (Elton Healy) appears in Hawkeye Vol.1 #3–4 (1983), Official Handbook of the Marvel Universe Vol.2 (1986), Captain America #317, 395, 411–414 (1986–1993), Avengers Spotlight #23–25 (1989), Guardians of the Galaxy #28 (1992), Hawkeye: Earth's Mightiest Marksman #1 (1998) and Wolverine Vol.2 #167 (2001). He was created by Mark Gruenwald.

The second Oddball (Orville Bock) appears in Union Jack Vol.2 #2 (2006), Official Handbook of the Marvel Universe A–Z Vol.3 (2008) and Dark Reign Files #1 (2009).

Fictional character biography

Elton Healey
 
Elton Healey was born in Reno, Nevada. Along with his brother Alvin, Elton spent years as a street performer, becoming a master juggler. He also learned how to become a capable street fighter. Using these skills, Elton became the juggling supervillain Oddball, adopting the name because of his loony nature.

Along with fellow juggling-themed supervillain Bombshell, Oddball was hired by Crossfire to eliminate Hawkeye and Mockingbird. Oddball and Bombshell confront and subdue the two heroes and deliver them to Crossfire. However, Hawkeye manages to escape and is able to defeat the three supervillains. Oddball and Bombshell were later rescued from prison by Oddball's brother Alvin, alias Tenpin.

Together with Bombshell, Tenpin, Knicknack, and Ringleader, Oddball forms the Death-Throws, a team of supervillain jugglers. The group are hired by Crossfire to help him escape from prison. The Death-Throws complete their mission, but decide to hold Crossfire hostage instead. The group are defeated and arrested by Hawkeye, Mockingbird and Captain America. Later, Oddball and the rest of the Death-Throws, along with various other supervillains, attempt to claim the bounty put on Hawkeye's right arm by Crossfire. However, all of the supervillains looking to claim the bounty are defeated by Hawkeye, Mockingbird and Trick Shot.

On his own again, Oddball dresses up as a police detective in order to ambush Hawkeye when he was showing Avengers young recruits Justice and Firestar around a prison. Oddball releases the prisoners in an attempt to swamp the heroes with enemies. Hawkeye and the young Avengers are able to win the battle and stop the prison riot. Oddball was later recruited by Doctor Octopus to join his incarnation of the Masters of Evil.
Oddball was killed when taking part in the Bloodsport competition in Madripoor (which also featured Wolverine, Mister X and Taskmaster). He was slain in the first round of the tournament by a tribal warrior called the Headhunter.

Orville Bock
Orville Bock became the new Oddball and joined the Death-Throws. Oddball joined the rest of the Death-Throws in London after they were hired by R.A.I.D to take part in a terrorist attack on the city. They were subsequently defeated by Union Jack and Sabra.

During the Dark Reign storyline, Quasimodo researched Oddball and the rest of the Death-Throws for Norman Osborn.

Powers and abilities
Oddball is an expert at juggling, pitching, and catching, with superb coordination, and is highly skilled with thrown objects. He normally carries an assortment of weighted balls and ball-shaped throwing weapons. He typically carried ten  diameter balls filled with various substances: tear gas, super-adhesive, hydrochloric acid, smoke, concentrated sulfur, spent uranium, itching powder, magnesium flare, a powerful impact-activated electromagnet, a powerful impact-activated sired, or other juggling balls with more exotic contents. He also carried marbles used to trip foes. Oddball has extensive experience in street fighting techniques.

Other versions

Last Avengers Story
In Last Avengers Story, set in an alternate universe, Oddball is a deformed man whose ability is to cause psychological disorders to manifest in anyone who touches him.

In other media
 Oddball appears in the video game Spider-Man and Captain America in Doctor Doom's Revenge (1989).

References

External links
 Oddball at Marvel.com
 
 
 Oddball I at Comic Vine

Characters created by Mark Gruenwald
Comics characters introduced in 1983
Fictional characters from Nevada
Fictional jugglers
Fictional mercenaries in comics
Marvel Comics supervillains